Lindsay Thomas (born 6 October 1955) is a former Australian rules footballer who played with St Kilda in the Victorian Football League (VFL).

Notes

External links 

Living people
1955 births
Australian rules footballers from Tasmania
St Kilda Football Club players
City-South Football Club players